Mirza Nasrulla Bahar Shirvani (1835, Shamakhi, Azerbaijan -  1883, Tabriz) was renowned Azerbaijani poet.

He was born in a wealthy family in Shamakhi where he studied Persian and Arabic languages. After the death of his father, he became a tradesman for a while. Later, he went to Iran and lived in Shiraz, Rey and Tus cities. Finally went to Tabriz and stayed there until his death in 1883. Her work is mainly Azerbaijani and Persian languages.

He was buried in the cemetery of Sorkhab district in Tabriz.

References 
 Zaman Əsgərli, XIX əsr Azərbaycan şeri antologiyası, Bakı, "Şərq-Qərb", 2005, p. 254, The ISBN printed in document (9952-418-69-5) is invalid.

Azerbaijani-language poets
1835 births
1883 deaths
People from Shamakhi
People from Tabriz
Persian-language poets
Azerbaijani emigrants to Iran
Emigrants from the Russian Empire to Iran
19th-century Iranian poets
19th-century Azerbaijani poets
Burials in Iran
19th-century male writers